To mark its 25th anniversary during the 2003–2004 season, the National Basketball League (NBL) announced its 25th Anniversary All-Time team on 9 December 2003.  As a way of recognising the single best and most influential player in league history, the player who received the most first-placed votes in the voting process for this team was also named the NBL 25th Anniversary Most Valuable Player.

To be eligible for selection, players and coaches must have played or coached in at least 100 NBL games.  Selection Committee members were asked to vote regardless of position, with Australian and import players eligible for selection.

The first-ranked player on each ballot received 10 votes, the second received nine, the third received eight, and so on down to the 10th-ranked player who received one vote.

Each Selection Committee member was asked to name the greatest coach in NBL history, with the top vote-getter receiving that honour. Past and present coaches on the selection committee were excluded from voting on the coach category.

 = active at the time the team was named

Other vote getters:

Other vote getters (coach):

Selection Committee Members: Bob Elphinston (chairman), Barry Barnes, David Claxton, Gary Fox, John Gardiner, Peter Harcourt, Bret Harris, Ron Harvey, Betty Hassen, Stephen Howell, Adrian Hurley, Andrew Johnstone, Phil Lynch, Lorraine Landon, John Maddock, Ken Madsen, Robyn Maher, Jan Morris, Boti Nagy, Bill Palmer, Barry Richardson, John Scott, Mal Speed, Dean Templeton, John Davidson, Perry Crosswhite, Tim Morrissey, Peter Kogoy, Peter Walsh, Phil Brown, Marty Clarke, Mike Wrublewski, Grantley Bernard, Dave Hughes.

See also
 National Basketball League (Australia)
 NBL (Australia) 20th Anniversary Team

25th Anniversary Team